|}

The Manifesto Novices' Chase is a Grade 1 National Hunt steeplechase in Great Britain which is open to horses aged five years or older. It is run at Aintree over a distance of about 2 miles and 4 furlongs (2 miles, 3 furlongs and 200 yards, or ), and during its running there are sixteen fences to be jumped. The race is for novice chasers, and it is scheduled to take place each year during the Grand National meeting in early April.

The event is named after Manifesto, a horse which ran eight times in the Grand National between 1895 and 1904. He won the race twice, finished third on three occasions and was fourth once.

The Manifesto Novices' Chase was established in 2009 as a Grade 2 race, and it features horses which ran previously in the Arkle Challenge Trophy and the JLT Novices' Chase. In 2012 the race was promoted to Grade 1 status.

Records
Leading jockey (2 wins):
 Richard Johnson – Wishfull Thinking (2011), Menorah (2012)
 Barry Geraghty – Mad Max (2010), Captain Conan (2013)

Leading trainer (2 wins):
 Philip Hobbs – Wishfull Thinking (2011), Menorah (2012)
 Nicky Henderson – Mad Max (2010), Captain Conan (2013)

Winners

See also
 Horse racing in Great Britain
 List of British National Hunt races

References

 Racing Post:

 aintree.co.uk – 2010 John Smith's Grand National Media Guide.
 pedigreequery.com – Manifesto Novices' Chase – Aintree.

National Hunt races in Great Britain
Aintree Racecourse
National Hunt chases
Recurring sporting events established in 2009
2009 establishments in England